Reference management software, citation management software, or bibliographic management software is software for scholars and authors to use for recording and utilising bibliographic citations (references) as well as managing project references either as a company or an individual. Once a citation has been recorded, it can be used time and again in generating bibliographies, such as lists of references in scholarly books, articles and essays. The development of reference management packages has been driven by the rapid expansion of scientific literature.

These software packages normally consist of a database in which full bibliographic references can be entered, plus a system for generating selective lists of articles in the different formats required by publishers and scholarly journals. Modern reference management packages can usually be integrated with word processors so that a reference list in the appropriate format is produced automatically as an article is written, reducing the risk that a cited source is not included in the reference list. They will also have a facility for importing the details of publications from bibliographic databases.

Reference management software does not do the same job as a bibliographic database, which tries to list all articles published in a particular discipline or group of disciplines. Such bibliographic databases are large and have to be housed on major server installations. Reference management software collects a much smaller database, of the publications that have been used or are likely to be used by a particular author or group, and such a database can easily be housed on an individual's personal computer.

Apart from managing references, most reference management software also enables users to search references from online libraries. These online libraries are usually based on Z39.50 public protocol. Users just need to specify the IP address, database name and keywords to start a Z39.50 search. It is quicker and more efficient than a web browser. However, Z39.50 is a little out of date. Some popular scientific websites, such as Google Scholar, IEEE Xplore and arXiv, do not support the Z39.50 protocol.

Citation creators
Citation creators or citation generators are online tools which facilitate the creation of works cited and bibliographies. Citation creators use web forms to take input and format the output according to guidelines and standards, such as the Modern Language Association's MLA Style Manual, American Psychological Association's APA style, The Chicago Manual of Style, or Turabian format. Some citation creators generate only run-time output, while others store the citation data for later use.

In different academic fields

Use by legal scholars
In 2013, a comparison of usage of EndNote, RefWorks, and Zotero among the legal scholars at the Oxford University Law Faculty was performed by survey. 0% of survey participants used RefWorks; 40% used Endnote; 17% used Zotero, mostly research students. The difficulty of using RefWorks, Endnote, and Zotero by Oxford legal scholars was estimated by the author as well. A comparison of these tools for legal scholars was made across several usage scenarios, including: installing and setting up OSCOLA citation style; building a personal legal bibliographic library and using extracting metadata from legal bibliographic databases; generating footnotes and bibliographies for academic publications; using and modifying OSCOLA citation style.

Reference management in Wikipedia

Wikipedia, which runs on MediaWiki software, has built-in tools for the management of references.  These tools—in many ways—have the function of reference-management software, in that they:

 automatically number the references
 generate the reference list 
 set up links between the component of the citation in the text and the reference list

Wikidata stores various attributes of scientific journals and journal articles in the main, item, namespace of Wikidata. 

Unlike traditional reference-management tools, MediaWiki does not store references in a database constructed to facilitate ease of citation.

See also
 Comparison of reference management software
 COinS – method to embed bibliographic metadata in the HTML code of web pages
 Z39.50 – international standard client–server, application layer communications protocol for searching and retrieving information from a database over a TCP/IP computer network; widely used in library environments

References

Further reading